O'riginal MC's sur une mission is the debut album of the French rap formation Idéal J that was released in 1996.

Track list
"Le combat continue"
"Ghettolude I"
"Je dois faire du cash"
"Comme personne ne l'a..."
"Le ghetto français"
"Ghettolude II: Histoire vraie"
"Show bizness"
"Uniquement pour les miens"
"Le ghetto" (remixed by Yvan)
"Ghettolude III: Fidèle au Hip-Hop"
"O'riginal MC's"

Idéal J albums
1996 debut albums